Russell Dauterman is an American comic book illustrator known for work on Supurbia for Boom! Studios and Nightwing for DC Comics. Before breaking into comics Dauterman served as a costume illustrator in the movie industry, working on such films as Captain America: The First Avenger.

In July 2014, Marvel Comics announced that Dauterman would be the artist on Thor series with writer Jason Aaron, which would debut that October, and feature a female Thor.

Bibliography
The Mis-Adventures of Adam West #1  (pencils only, with writers Darren G. Davis, Adam West and Reed Lackey, Bluewater Productions, July 2011)
Annie Automatic: Killer in Disguise #0 (illustrator, with writer Sam Scott, Whisper City Productions, July 2011)
Supurbia Vol. 1 #1–4 (pencils and inks, with writer Grace Randolph, Boom! Studios, March 2012 – June 2012)
Supurbia Vol. 2 #1–12 (pencils and inks, with writer Grace Randolph, Boom! Studios, November 2012 – October 2013)
Nightwing #28–29 (pencils and inks, with writer Kyle Higgins, DC Comics, February 2014 – March 2014)
Cyclops (2014) #1–3 (pencils and inks, with writer Greg Rucka, Marvel Comics, May 2014 – July 2014)
Thor (2014) #1–4, 6–8 (pencils and inks, with writer Jason Aaron, Marvel Comics, October 2014 – May 2015)
The Mighty Thor (2015) #1–5, 8–12, 15–20, 22, 700, 702–706 (pencils and inks, with writer Jason Aaron, Marvel Comics, November 2015 – April 2018)
Unworthy Thor #4 (pencils and inks, with writer Jason Aaron and artists Frazer Irving, Esad Ribić, Olivier Coipel and Kim Jacinto, Marvel Comics, February 2017)
War of The Realms #1–6 (pencils and inks, with writer Jason Aaron, Marvel Comics, April 2019 – June 2019)
Giant Size X-Men: Jean Grey and Emma Frost #1 (pencils and inks, with writer Jonathan Hickman, Marvel Comics, February 2020)
Marauders (covers, with writer Gerry Duggan, Marvel Comics, October 2019 – present)
Giant-Size X-Men: Storm #1 (pencils and inks, with writer Jonathan Hickman, Marvel Comics, September 2020)
X-Men (Vol. 5) #21 (pencils and inks, with writer Jonathan Hickman, Marvel Comics, June 2021)
X-Men: Hellfire Gala #1 (pencils and inks, with writer Gerry Duggan, Marvel Comics, July 2022)

Filmography
The Girl with the Dragon Tattoo (2011) Costume illustrator
Captain America: The First Avenger (2011) – Costume illustrator

References

External links

Russell Dauterman at the Big Comic Book DataBase

Living people
American comics artists
Year of birth missing (living people)
21st-century American artists
Place of birth missing (living people)